Maaike Schoorel (born 1973) is an artist based in London.

Schoorel was born in Santpoort, Netherlands.  She makes paintings based on photographs, using traditional genres such as landscape, portrait and still-life.  She favours pale colours and minimal detail.

Maaike Schoorel is represented in London by Maureen Paley.

Selected exhibitions

2015

Maureen Paley, London, UK
    
2014
 
Interiors, Stigter Van Doesburg, Amsterdam, The Netherlands
    
2013
 
Conservatory, Mendes Wood, São Paulo.
    
2012
    
Tribute, Maureen Paley, London, UK
    
2011
 
Maaike Schoorel – Zelfportretten & Stillevens, the Embassy of the Kingdom of the Netherlands, London
    
zwart / wit dagboek, Galerie Diana Stigter, Amsterdam
    
Maaike Schoorel, Marc Foxx, Los Angeles

2010

Art Features, Art 41 Basel, Galerie Diana Stigter

2009

Nudes and Garden, Marc Foxx, Los Angeles
   
2008

Album, Museum de Hallen, Haarlem,

Nudes, Maureen Paley, London

2007

Prix de Rome 2007, de Appel, Amsterdam

The Triumph of Painting, The Saatchi Gallery, London

How to Endure, curated by Tom Morton, Athens Biennial, Athens

Very Abstract and Hyper Figurative, curated by Jens Hoffmann, Thomas Dane Gallery, London

Zes, Marc Foxx, LA, & Harris Lieberman, New York

Stilleven, Portret, Schutterstuk, Marc Foxx: West Gallery, Los Angeles

2006

Just in time, Stedelijk Museum, Amsterdam

2005

Slow Art, Museum Kunst Palast, Düsseldorf

Prague Biennale 2, presentation for Flash Art, Prague

IBID Projects, Vilnius, London.

2004

Galerie Diana Stigter, Rheinschau, Cologne

Must I paint you a Picture?, Haunch of Venison, London

2003

Someplace Unreachable, IBID Projects, London

2002

Koninklijke Subsidie voor Vrije Schilderkunst, Gemeente Museum, The Hague

Band in Crisis, (with Skill 7 Stamina 12), Cooper Gallery, Dundee

References

External links
Further information from Galerie Diana Stigter
Images, texts and biography from the Saatchi Gallery
Ana Finel Honigman on Maaike Schoorel's exhibition at Maureen Paley from ArtNet.com
Maaike Schoorel on ArtFacts.com

1973 births
Living people
People from Velsen
Dutch women artists
Dutch contemporary artists